curious directive is a British Theatre company led by director Jack Lowe. The company is an ensemble of theatre makers and scientists  founded in the autumn of 2008 with a production called Return to the Silence.

Their productions are devised and written by members of the company, dealing with themes of science.  The company uses many threads of theatre tools including cameras, projection, live music and movement. They are building a reputation for their multi-layered narratives spanning different times and spaces.

Recent productions have explored astro-biology, the NHS, myrmecology, cognitive neuroscience, light, architecture, genetics, motion and bio-politics.

The company explores life in all its diversity and complexity through the lens of science."

Past Work

Awards 
 Scotsman Fringe First Award for Your Last Breath
 Arden Entertainment Show Award for Ben Canning for Boy In Darkness

Reviews 
 Pioneer - **** review by Sally Stott (The Scotsman)
 The Kindness of Strangers - **** review by Lyn Gardner (The Guardian)
 After The Rainfall - **** review by Laura Barnett (The Telegraph)
 Your Last Breath - **** review by Lyn Gardner (The Guardian)

References

Theatre companies in England
2008 establishments in England